Ultimate Epic Battle Simulator (UEBS) is a battle simulation fighting video game developed and published by Canadian developer Brilliant Game Studios. The game was released in Steam early access on April 12, 2017 for Microsoft Windows, and was fully released on June 2, 2017 for Microsoft Windows. The sequel, Ultimate Epic Battle Simulator 2, was released into early access on May 12, 2022.

Gameplay
In the game you can have two factions compete against each other. This can be, for example, historical units and personalities (e.g. catapults, knights, soldiers or Jesus Christ), film and comic characters (e.g. Chuck Norris or Godzilla), animals or fantasy beings (e.g. orcs or trolls). These have different skills and weapons available. The player also has the option of defining the battlefield and the positioning and number of units. Using artificial intelligence, the units fight against each other until there are no enemy units left.

Reception
GameStar reports on the simulator, it is less a game than a technical toy, could be clash in which vast armies. Since there is no unit limit, all computer hardware will eventually fail.

PC Games Hardware describes the game as an indie game by a 1-man team, which offers the player a huge sandbox to simulate gigantic mass battles between thousands and thousands of units. In general, however, some players criticize the lack of game content and say that it is nothing more than a nice tool, but it has a lot of potential and offers funny scenes and moments.

References

2017 video games
Open-world video games
Simulation video games
Strategy video games
Video games developed in Canada
Windows games
Windows-only games